Daniela Cociu (born 4 May 2000) is a Moldovan sprint canoer.

She qualified at the 2020 Summer Olympics, in the C-1 200 meters, and C-2 500 meters.

She competed at the 2017 ICF Canoe Sprint World Championships.

References 

Moldovan female canoeists
Living people
2000 births
Canoeists at the 2020 Summer Olympics
Olympic canoeists of Moldova